Acraephia is a genus of planthoppers in the family Fulgoridae.

Species
 Acraephia fasciata
 Acraephia flavescens
 Acraephia multifaria
 Acraephia oculata
 Acraephia opaca
 Acraephia pallida
 Acraephia perspicillata
 Acraephia rubriceps
 Acraephia specularis
 Acraephia stoica

References 

Auchenorrhyncha genera
Poiocerinae